Jadów  is a village in Wołomin County, Masovian Voivodeship, in east-central Poland. It is the seat of the gmina (administrative district) called Gmina Jadów.

The village has a population of 1,200.

History
The beginnings of Jadów are dated to the late Middle Ages. In 1475, thanks to its location by a trade route, Jadów obtained a market privilege and the right to organize fairs.

Architecture
In 1474 the first church was built by Bolesław IV. The most valuable part of the urban area is the small market square with tenement houses around.

Jews of Jadów
Between the two world wars there were about 1500 Jews living in Jadów, which constituted approximately 90% of its inhabitants. The Zionist movement was present in the community. Along with the occupation of the village by German troops in 1939, many restrictions were enforced upon the Jewish population, including payments, wearing an identifying band on the arm, forced labor, etc. 
In September 1942, a killing act (German “Aktion”) was enacted by Nazi troops, where approximately 800 Jews were shot to death. The rest were sent to the Treblinka extermination camp.

Notable people
 Gustaw Orlicz-Dreszer (1889–1936), Polish general, and political and social activist.

References

External links
 Satellite photo
 Jewish Community in Jadów on Virtual Shtetl

Villages in Wołomin County
Warsaw Voivodeship (1919–1939)
Holocaust locations in Poland